Thomas Heilmann (born 16 July 1964) is a German politician of the Christian Democratic Union (CDU). Born in Dortmund, North Rhine-Westphalia, he has served as a member of the Bundestag from the state of Berlin since 2017.

Career in the private sector 
From 2001 until 2008, Heilmann was a partner and CEO of Scholz & Friends. In 2001, he was nominated to join the supervisory board of Axel Springer SE; however, he was replaced by Axel Sven Springer before the vote.

At the request of Federal Minister of Labour and Social Affairs Ursula von der Leyen, Heilmann negotiated a high-profile agreement between investor Nicolas Berggruen and other shareholders on the sale of embattled department house chain Karstadt in 2010.

From 2011 until 2012, Heilmann briefly served as chair of the board at Save the Children Germany.

Political career

Career in state government
From 2012 until 2016, Heilmann served as State Minister of Justice and Consumer Protection in the coalition governments of successive Governing Mayors of Berlin Klaus Wowereit (2012–2014) and Michael Müller (2014–2016).

In the negotiations to form a Grand Coalition of Chancellor Angela Merkel's Christian Democrats (CDU together with the Bavarian CSU) and the Social Democrats (SPD) following the 2013 German elections, Heilmann was part of the CDU/CSU delegation in the working group on digital policy, led by Dorothee Bär and Brigitte Zypries.

In the 2016 state elections, Heilmann unsuccessfully ran for a seat in the State Parliament.

Member of the German Parliament, 2017–present
Heilmann became a member of the Bundestag in the 2017 German federal election, representing Berlin's Steglitz-Zehlendorf district. In parliament, he has served on the Committee on Labour and Social Affairs (2018–2021), the Committee on the Digital Agenda (2018–2021) and the Committee on Economic Affairs and Climate Action (since 2021). In his first term, he was his parliamentary group's rapporteur on blockchain.

Within the CDU/CSU parliamentary group, Heilmann has been leading the group of CDU parliamentarians from Berlin since 2021.

In the negotiations to form a coalition government between the CDU and the Social Democratic Party (SPD) under the leadership of Kai Wegner following Berlin’s 2023 state elections, Heilmann was part of his party’s delegation to the working group on mobility, climate action and environmental protection.

Other activities

Government agencies 
 Federal Network Agency for Electricity, Gas, Telecommunications, Post and Railway (BNetzA), Alternate Member of the Advisory Board (since 2022)

Corporate boards 
 BwConsulting, Member of the advisory board (since 2017)
 Scholz & Friends, Member of the supervisory board (2008–2010)
 Cision, Member of the Board of Directors (2007–2012)
 Deutsche Bank, Member of the advisory board (2003–2010)

Non-profit organizations 
 Save the Children Germany, Member of the supervisory board (since 2016)
 betterplace.org, Member of the Advisory Board
 Museum Berggruen, Member of the International Council
 Save the Children International, Member of the Board of Trustees (2016–2018)
 Berlin School of Economics and Law (HWR), Member of the Board of Trustees

Political positions 
Ahead of the Christian Democrats' leadership election in 2018, Heilmann publicly endorsed Annegret Kramp-Karrenbauer to succeed Angela Merkel as the party's chair.

References

External links 

  
 Bundestag biography 

1964 births
Living people
Members of the Bundestag for Berlin
Members of the Bundestag 2021–2025
Members of the Bundestag 2017–2021
Members of the Bundestag for the Christian Democratic Union of Germany